Dong-ah Institute of Media and Arts (formerly known as Dong-Ah Broadcasting College) is a technical college in South Korea specialized in training professionals in the fields of media design, production, and communications.  The campus is situated in Samjuk-myeon, Anseong City, Gyeonggi province, South Korea. The name has been changed to Dong-Ah Institute of Media and Arts as of January 15, 2007.

Dong-ah Institute of Media and Arts was ranked 171st (tied with Jeju National University and Kumoh National Institute of Technology) in Asia by QS Asian Universities Ranking in 2010.

Academics

The school's academic offerings are provided through various divisions such as Broadcasting Technology, Multimedia Production, and Internet Broadcasting.  Courses of study are two to three years in length.

Associate Degree Program (3-year program)

School of Broadcasting and Arts Convergence
Division of Broadcast Technology
  Major: Broadcast Production Technology, Broadcast System, Broadcast Sound Technology 
Department of Audio Production (Track: Music Engineering, Sound Post Production & Design, Live Sound)
Department of New Media Content
School of Media Content
Department of Visual Production
Department of Broadcast Writing
Department of Broadcast Journalism and Production
Department of Digital Image Design
Department of Advertising Production
School of Entertainment
Department of Acting for Screen
Department of K-pop Performance
Department of Fashion Styling
Department of Entertainment Management
School of Arts
Division of Performing Arts
Major: Theatre, Musical Theatre, Korean Traditional Performing Arts
Department of Film Arts
Department of Scenography
School of Applied Music
Division of Applied Music
Major: - Vocal Performance (Principal Study: Vocal Performance, Songwriting) - Instrumental Performance (Principal Study: Jazz Piano, Guitar, Bass, Drum, Wind Instrument and Percussion) - Composition (Principal Study: Producing, Songwriting, Electronic Music Production)
Multi Major Program
Interdisciplinary Program : Combined Major
Interdisciplinary Program : Convergence Major
Student-Designed Major
Bachelor's Degree Program (1-year program after completing 3-year AA degree course) 

School of Broadcasting and Arts Production
Department of Broadcast Technology
Department of Broadcast Journalism and Production
Department of Applied Music
Department of Audio Production
Department of K-pop Performance
Department of Media Content Production (Track: Broadcasting Content Production and Film Production)
Department of Acting Arts (Track: Performing Arts and Acting for Screen)
Department of Arts and Culture Marketing

History

The school was opened in 1997 as Dong-ah Broadcasting Specialized College.
On January 15, 2007 the school was renamed Dong-ah Institute Of Media and Arts.

Dong-ah has a student-exchange program with Illinois State University where Korean students can graduate with a degree from an American University and ISU students can spend a semester or more abroad experiencing the Korean culture. Dong-ah also has a student-exchange program with California State University, Fullerton called the DIMA program and caters especially to Communications majors.

Notable alumni

 
 

 Bae Woo-hee (Dal Shabet)
 Cho Seung-youn (UNIQ/X1)
 Cho Yoon-woo
 Ha Sung-woon (Wanna One/Hotshot) 
 Heo Sol-ji (EXID)
 Hyuk (VIXX) 
 Jang Dong-min 
 JeA (Brown Eyed Girls)
 JR (NU'EST)
 Jun. K (2PM)
 Kim Kiri 
 Kim Woo-seok (UP10TION/X1)
 Yoo Kihyun (Monsta X)
 Kwon Eun-bi
 Lee Chang-min (2AM and Homme)
 Lee Don-ku
 Lee Eun-gyeol
 Lee Hee-jin (Baby V.O.X)
 Lee Hong-bin (VIXX)
 Lee Jung 
 Lee Kwang-soo
 Lee Yeon-doo
 Michelle Lee 
 Nam Hyun-joon
 Noh Woo-jin 
 Park Sung-kwang 
 Woohyun (Infinite) 
 Song Yuvin (Myteen/B.O.Y).
 Yang Yo-seob (Highlight)
 Yoo Se-yoon 
 Zico (Block B)

See also
Education in South Korea
List of colleges and universities in South Korea

References

External links

Official school website, in English
Official school website, in Korean

Universities and colleges in Gyeonggi Province
Vocational education in South Korea